This is a near-complete list of recordings made by the South African vocal group Ladysmith Black Mambazo.

The group was offered a recording contract to Gallo Record Company, the largest record company in South Africa, in 1973. They accepted, and remain with the studio today. Ladysmith Black Mambazo's first release Amabutho (1973) sold over 25,000 copies and became the first release in South Africa by Black musicians to receive gold status. Their early recordings – recorded for Gallo's 'black music' division Mavuthela Music Company – sold very well.

In 1975, Shabalala converted to Christianity and the group released their first religious album, Ukukhanya Kwelanga. It earned a double platinum disc award, and the group's repertoire came to be dominated by hymns, mostly Methodist. Their 1976 Ukusindiswa became one of their most popular religious albums. By 1981, the group was well known throughout South Africa, and was allowed to travel to Cologne, Germany. The group toured the country and appeared on television, and learned some of the German language; the 1981 album Phansi Emgodini included a German-language song, "Wir Grüssen Euch Alle". The following year, the group traveled back to Germany to appear on a televised quiz show, bringing about requests for live appearances.

Ladysmith Black Mambazo has since released over fifty studio recordings; many more assorted compilations, cassette tapes, videotapes, and DVDs have been released.

Discography

Albums

  Catalogue numbers in bold represent Hybrid SACD and/or enhanced versions

Singles

1986: "Diamonds on the Soles of Her Shoes" (Paul Simon feat. Ladysmith Black Mambazo) (from Paul Simon album Graceland)
1995: "Swing Low, Sweet Chariot" (China Black & Ladysmith Black Mambazo)
1999: "Ain't No Sunshine" (Ladysmith Black Mambazo feat. Des'ree)
2000: "I Shall Be There" (B*Witched feat. Ladysmith Black Mambazo)
2014: "Lift Me Up" (David Guetta feat. Nico & Vinz & Ladysmith Black Mambazo) (from David Guetta album Listen)

References

Discography
Discographies of South African artists
Folk music discographies